Norm Fisher (born 22 October 1963) is a Canadian bass guitar player.  He is most famous as a member of Canadian rocker Bryan Adams' backing band.  He has also performed with other musicians such as Burton Cummings, Randy Bachman, Powder Blues Band, Long John Baldry, Paul Dean and Colin James.

Background 
Fisher was born on 22 October 1963, in High Prairie, Alberta.  His family later moved to Vancouver.  Fisher had an interest in music early in life, playing various instruments until settling on the bass guitar.  Fisher was influenced by groups such as Led Zeppelin, the Rolling Stones, ZZ Top, Aerosmith, Queen, Pink Floyd and Black Sabbath.  Through high school and beyond, Fisher played in musical groups and later played with professional musicians.

Bryan Adams 
In 2002, Fisher was hired by Bryan Adams to play bass guitar in his backing band, a position he held until February 2016 when he stepped away from touring with Adams to care for a family member. He has played on Adams' albums Room Service and 11.

Personal life 
Fisher currently lives in Vancouver and has a keen interest in motorcycles and fishing.

References 

1963 births
Living people
Musicians from Vancouver
Canadian rock bass guitarists
People from Big Lakes County
Musicians from Alberta